The 2019 Nigerian Senate election in Enugu State was held on February 23, 2019, to elect members of the Nigerian Senate to represent Enugu State. Ike Ekweremadu representing Enugu West, Chimaroke Ogbonnia Nnamani representing Enugu East and Utazi Chukwuka representing Enugu North all won on the platform of Peoples Democratic Party.

Overview

Summary

Results

Enugu West 
A total of 18 candidates registered with the Independent National Electoral Commission to contest in the election. PDP candidate Ike Ekweremadu won the election, defeating APC candidate, Juliet Ibekaku-Nwagwu and 16 other party candidates. Ekeweremadu scored 86,088 votes, while  APC candidate Ibekaku-Nwagwu scored 15,187 votes.

Enugu East 
A total of 20 candidates registered with the Independent National Electoral Commission to contest in the election. PDP candidate, Chimaroke Nnamani won the election, defeating APC candidate Lawrence Ozeh and 18 other party candidates. Nnamani pulled 128,853 votes, while APC candidate Ozeh scored 14,225.

Enugu North 
A total of 13 candidates registered with the Independent National Electoral Commission to contest in the election. PDP candidate Utazi Chukwuka won the election, defeating APC candidate Ogbonna Odo. Chukwuka pulled 146,458 votes while his closest rival Odo pulled 22,229.

References 

Enugu State senatorial elections